From the Heart is an album by jazz vocalist Etta Jones which was recorded in early 1962 and released on the Prestige label.

Reception

Scott Yanow of Allmusic states, "From the Heart is a lot of fun, a too-long-forgotten gem that takes the listener back to a more innocent time and provides the perfect setting for Etta Jones to display her vocal wares".

Track listing 
 "Just Friends" (John Klenner, Sam M. Lewis) – 3:00
 "By the Bend of the River" (Clara Edwards) – 2:14     
 "Makin' Whoopee" (Walter Donaldson, Gus Kahn) – 2:50     
 "You Came a Long Way from St. Louis" (John Benson Brooks, Bob Russell) – 2:26     
 "Funny (Not Much)" (Scott Edward, Larry Holofcener) – 3:07     
 "They Can't Take That Away from Me" (George Gershwin, Ira Gershwin) – 2:07     
 "I'll Never Be Free" (Bennie Benjamin, George Weiss) – 3:05
 "(I'm Afraid) the Masquerade Is Over" (Herb Magidson, Allie Wrubel) – 2:56     
 "Good Morning Heartache" (Ervin Drake, Dan Fisher, Irene Higginbotham) – 2:33     
 "Look for the Silver Lining" (Buddy DeSylva, Jerome Kern) – 2:27     
 "There Goes My Heart" (Benny Davis, Abner Silver) – 3:17  
Recorded at Van Gelder Studio in Englewood Cliffs, New Jersey on February 8, 1962 (tracks 1, 5, 7 & 11) and February 9, 1962 (tracks 2–4, 6 & 8–10)

Personnel 
Etta Jones – vocals
Lloyd Mayers – piano
Wally Richardson – guitar 
Bob Bushnell – bass 
Ed Shaughnessy – drums
horn section added on tracks 3, 4, 8, 10
Joe Wilder – trumpet
Jerry Dodgion, Oliver Nelson – alto saxophone
Bob Ashton, George Barrow – tenor saxophone
unidentified string section added on tracks 1, 5, 7 & 11
Arranged and conducted by Oliver Nelson.

References 

Etta Jones albums
1962 albums
Prestige Records albums
Albums recorded at Van Gelder Studio
Albums produced by Esmond Edwards
Albums arranged by Oliver Nelson